This is a list of adult nonfiction books that topped The New York Times Nonfiction Best Seller list in 1984.

The distinct list for "Advice, How-To, and Miscellaneous" debuted January 1, 1984. Its number one bestseller (The Body Principal by Victoria Principal) had been number ten and number twelve on the nonfiction lists for the two preceding weeks.

References

External links 
 Historic New York Times Lists

1984

1984 in the United States